The Arrowcar (or Arrow-Car) is a specially designed arrow-shaped automobile used by the DC Comics superhero Green Arrow and his sidekick Speedy. The Arrow-Car debuted in More Fun Comics #73 (November 1941), and was created by Mort Weisinger and George Papp.

History
The design and function of the Arrow-Car was similar to that of Batman's Batmobile. The Arrow-Car (inexplicably called "the Arrow-Plane" in the beginning) was introduced during the time when Green Arrow comics mostly followed a similar formula as Batman (sans the depth and tragedy). It was in use for many years and there were several versions of it, all with various upgrades and re-designs.

Status
After Green Arrow (Oliver Queen) lost his fortune, the Arrow-Car became too expensive to keep. Various wrecks of the cars became highly prized among collectors of super-memorabilia, such as an Arrow-Car was once destroyed during a fight between Green Arrow, Arsenal, and Solomon Grundy. When a fully functional Arrow-Car went on the auction block for sale, criminal elements bought it and wanted to use it for their own purposes. For instance the criminal Scavenger claimed it for his weapon collection, but Batman bought it on Green Arrow's behalf. However, once it broke down on the way back to Star City after picking it up, Green Arrow decided to destroy it after all, using the same detonator he used the first time, but this time knowing it would work since he had it fixed by Superman.

Other media
In Batman: The Brave and the Bold, the Arrow-Car is seen as the car Green Arrow uses in the episode "Hail the Tornado Tyrant!".

See also
 List of fictional vehicles

References

External links
DCU Guide: Arrow-Car  
DC Database: Arrowcar
Megomuseum: Playsets and Vehicles - The Arrowcar
Spider-bob.com: Arrowcar

Green Arrow
Fictional elements introduced in 1941